Thyroepiglottic may refer to:

 Thyroepiglottic ligament
 Thyroepiglottic muscle